This is the discography of American rapper and actor Maserati Rome or simply Rome, formerly known as Lil' Romeo or Romeo. It consists of three studio albums, one independent album, three soundtracks, five Extended plays, five mixtapes, thirteen singles, two compilation albums, four collaboration albums, and twenty-two music videos. His music has been released on No Limit Records, Soulja Music Entertainment, The New No Limit, Priority Records, Universal Records, Koch Records, UrbanDigital Records, GoDigital Music Group & LPD Music along with his former record labels Guttar Music, Take A Stand, The Next Generation Entertainment and his current label No Limit Forever.

In 2001, Miller's debut album Lil 'Romeo charted on the US Billboard 200 at number six, making it Romeo's first top ten album and his only Gold-certified album. The album contained Romeo's most successful single to date "My Baby". A music video was made featuring cameos from a Michael Jackson imitator, Silkk Tha Shocker and Master P. In 2002, his next album Game Time, though not as successful as his previous effort (chart wise) charted at number thirty-three on the US Billboard 200.  His next album Romeoland charted on the Billboard 200 at number seventy.

In 2005, Miller along with his father Master P & his Uncle Silkk the Shocker, reformed the pioneer rap group TRU and released their final album entitled The Truth. It charted on the US Billboard 200 at number fifty-four. The same year, Romeo would also release another collaboration entitled Young Ballers: The Hood Been Good to Us with his newly formed group at the time Rich Boyz. In 2006, Romeo would release his independent album entitled Lottery it charted on the Billboard 200 at number forty. Also In 2006, Miller released the soundtrack to his movie God's Gift, it was his first album released under his name changed to Romeo. In 2007, Romeo would collaborate again on a new album with his father Master P as the Miller Boyz entitled Hip Hop History, it did not chart on any Billboard charts. In 2009, Romeo released his second compilation album entitled Get Low it charted on the Billboard 200 at one-hundred-forty, making it Miller's first album to chart in four years.

In 2010, Miller formed his new group College Boyys and created a new label called The Next Generation Entertainment, and they released their debut album entitled Spring Break.

Albums

Studio albums

Collaboration albums

Soundtrack albums

Mixtapes

Compilation albums

Extended plays

Singles

As lead artist

Promotional singles

As featured artist

Collaboration singles

Videography

Studio album music videos

EPs/Mixtape music videos

Guest appearances
2002: Hilary Duff - "Tell Me a Story (About the Night Before)" (featuring Lil' Romeo)
2002: Lil' Corey - "Hush Lil' Lady" (featuring Lil' Romeo & Lil' Reema)
2002: 504 Boyz - "Tight Whips" (featuring Slay Sean, 5th Ward Weebie, Lil' Romeo, Little D & Papa Reu)
2005: Master P - "I Need Dubs" (featuring Romeo)
2006: Bengie B - "Everyday Im Shinin" (featuring Gangsta, C-Los & Romeo)
2006: C-Los - "If" (featuring Romeo)
2008: Colby O'Donis - "Take You Away" (featuring Romeo) 
2010: K. Smith - "Runaway" (featuring Romeo & Black Don)
2010: K. Smith - "Money Flow" (featuring Black Don, Six & Romeo)
2011: Master P as Monstahh - "Meagon Good" (featuring Bengie B, Valentino & Romeo)
2011: Master P as Monstahh - "Trending" (featuring Gucci Mane & Romeo)
2011: Ay - "Speak With Ya Body" (featuring Lamiya & Romeo)
2011: Master P - "TMZ (Too Many Zeroes)" (featuring Romeo, Bengie B, T.E.C. & Miss Chee)
2011: Master P - "I Can Smell The Money" (featuring T.E.C., Eastwood, G5-J, Romeo, Bengie B & Miss Chee)
2012: Cymphonique - "All That" (featuring Romeo & P-Nut)
2013: Master P - "I Need An Armored Truck" (featuring Rome)
2013: Master P - "Makes You Stronger" (featuring Rome, Dee-1 & Silkk The Shocker)
2013: Master P - "Next Shooting Star" (featuring Rome & Dee-1)
2013: Master P - "Ghost" (featuring Rome)
2014: Master P - "Real From Day One" (featuring Maserati Rome & Silkk The Shocker)

References

Hip hop discographies
Discographies of American artists